There are hundreds of kilometres of , , , and  narrow-gauge lines in Poland. The metre-gauge lines are mostly found in the northwest part of the country in Pomerania, while  lines are found only in the Upper Silesia region.  is the most commonly used narrow gauge; it is used, for example, in the Rogów Narrow Gauge Railway (Rogowska Kolej Wąskotorowa) and in Tarnowskie Góry with the world's oldest narrow-gauge railway in continuous service since 1853. Some narrow-gauge lines in Poland still operate as common carrier (for example the lines operated by SKPL, the Association of Local Railway Haulage), while others survive as tourist attractions. One of the finest of the latter is the  narrow-gauge railway (Żnińska Kolej Powiatowa) running from Żnin via Wenecja (Polish Venice) and famous Biskupin to Gąsawa in the Pałuki region. Railway traditions of Pałuki date back to July 1894 when the first two lines were opened.

From 1930s until the 1960s most of 600mm gauge lines were converted to 750mm (in the meantime, after World War II Poland lost territories in the east and acquired territories in the west and north). After the war, in 1948–1949, 2984 km of local public railways were nationalized and taken over by the Polish State Railways (PKP). As a result, in 1950 there were 4146 km of PKP narrow-gauge lines, including 1293 km of 600mm gauge and 1127 km of 750mm gauge. There were also 914 km of 1000mm gauge public railways, mostly on ex-German territories. In the 1950s and 1960s, 748 km of 600mm gauge and 275 km of other lines were converted to 750mm. There were also 951 km of forest railways and 724 km of sugar beet railways in 1950, and a number of isolated industrial railways. From the 1960s, narrow-gauge railways started to decline, with the development of road transport. The service on narrow-gauge lines were continued by PKP until 2001. But this is a 3-rail route, and only the standard gauge is daily used. The narrow gauge track is used on some sundays. Exploitation of both is by SKPL, the only railway company with two different track-gauges in Poland.

In the past, there have also been ,  and  lines. A  recreational line 4.2 km long had been operating in the Amusement-Recreation Park in Chorzów (now converted to 785), Upper Silesia . A similar  line, Kolejka Parkowa Maltanka, operates in Poznań. Some of Poland's narrow-gauge railways are maintained by volunteers; one organization dedicated to preserving narrow-gauge railways is the FPKW, the Polish Narrow Gauge Railways Foundation.

A few tramways also use 1000mm gauge, in Bydgoszcz, Elbląg, Grudziądz, Łódź and Toruń.

Overview

 , tourist railway
 , several systems including , tourist railway (30 km)

 , defunct

  (Upper-Silesian narrow-gauge railways), now a tourist railway (21+6 km)
 Zabytkowa Stacja Kolei Wąskotorowej w Rudach, tourist railway

 Bieszczadzka Kolejka Leśna, partly a tourist railway
 , regauged from 1000 mm in 1951, tourist railway (15 km)
 , regauged from 600 mm in 1957, tourist railway
 , tourist railway
 , defunct
 Krośniewicka Kolej Dojazdowa, defunct but plans to renew
 Marecka Kolej Dojazdowa, regauged from 800 mm in 1951, defunct
 , tourist railway
 , revenue passenger service by SKPL between Pleszew and Kowalew.
 , regauged from 760 mm, tourist railway (46 km)
 , regauged from 600 mm, tourist railway (49 km)
 , regauged from 1000mm in 1958, tourist railway (17 km)
 , formerly Sochaczewska Kolej Powiatowa, tourist railway
 , regauged from 1000 mm in 1952–54, tourist railway
 , tourist railway
 , regauged from 600 mm in 1951, tourist railway
 ; regauged from 600 mm in 1957, defunct
 , tourist railway

 Dobre Aleksandrowskie–Kruszwica; defunct

 ; 106 km, defunct
 ; 82.4 km, defunct
 ; several defunct systems
 Kolejka Parkowa Maltanka; operating
 Narrow Gauge Railway Museum in Wenecja (located alongside, but not connected to, the Żnińska Kolej Powiatowa)
 , defunct (27 km)
 , defunct (57 km)
 , partly tourist railway (144 km)
  (Żnin district railway), partly tourist railway

References